Bulovka Hospital is a large teaching hospital complex in Prague, situated on a hillock adjoining the  in Prague 8 - Libeň near the defunct homestead of Bulovka. The most striking building in the complex is the hospital's famous neo-Rococo building called .

See also 
 Motol University Hospital, another major teaching hospital complex in Prague

References

External links 
 http://bulovka.cz/
 

Hospitals in Prague
Teaching hospitals
1931 establishments in Czechoslovakia
Hospitals established in 1931
20th-century architecture in the Czech Republic